Santa Terezinha is the easternmost municipality in the Brazilian state of Mato Grosso.

The city is served by Santa Terezinha Airport.

References

Municipalities in Mato Grosso